Fake fur, also called faux fur, is a pile fabric engineered to have the appearance and warmth of animal fur.

It was first introduced on the market in 1929 using hair from the South American alpaca. The quality of fake furs was greatly improved in the 1940s by advances in textile manufacture. Modern fake furs were developed in the mid-1950s, with acrylic polymers replacing alpaca hair.

The promotion of fake furs by animal rights and animal welfare organizations has contributed to its increasing popularity as an animal-friendly alternative to traditional fur clothing.

Uses 

Fake fur is used in all applications where real fur would be used, including stuffed animals, fashion accessories, and home decorations like pillows, bedding and throws. It is also used for craft projects because it can be sewn on a standard sewing machine whereas real fur is generally thicker and requires a special machine, hand sewing, or an awl. Fake fur is increasingly used in mainstream teen fashion; the stores Abercrombie & Fitch and American Eagle use fake furs in their trapper hats and jackets. Ralph Lauren has promoted the use of fake fur in its collections. 

Fake fur is widely used in making fursuits in the furry community.

In the Soviet, and now Russian Army, fish fur is a derogatory term for low-quality winter clothing and ushanka hats, from a proverb that "a poor man's fur coat is of fish fur".

Comparison to real fur 
Unlike real fur, fake fur is a fabric and is therefore relatively easy to sew. It does not require cold storage to prevent deterioration and is not prone to being eaten by moths. This study has been criticized as being biased and outdated. It is also cheaper than real fur.

It is not as insulating and does not allow the skin to breathe as much as real fur. It is also less biodegradable; it is made from various materials including blends of acrylic and modacrylic polymers derived from coal, air, water, petroleum and limestone. These synthetic materials can take a long time to break down, possibly anywhere from 500 to 1,000 years. Fake furs are not able to keep snow from melting and re-freezing on the fiber filaments; this is very important, especially in hiking, mountain climbing, skiing and other outdoor activities which are done in extreme conditions.

How to store fake fur 
Fake fur can be made from a variety of materials including polyester, nylon, or acrylic. To make sure your fake fur stays in good condition, It is important to store fake fur away from humidity and sunlight because it can cause the fibers to become brittle and break easily. Anifurry’s designer recommends that it is best to store fake fur in something like a garment bag or container. It should also be stored away from heat because it can cause the fibers to melt together. A quote from the designer is "Even if you can't find a container or garment bag, make sure the fur has enough room to breathe! Yeah, faux fur needs to breathe as well."

Use of actual fur 
In a test by the Humane Society of the United States, coats labeled as having faux-fur trim used actual fur. In the United States, up until 2012, a labeling loophole allowed any piece of clothing that contains less than US$150 of fur to be labeled without mentioning that it included fur. This is the equivalent of thirty rabbits, three raccoons, three red foxes, two to five leopards, twenty ring tailed lemurs, three domestic dogs, or one bear.

Fashion designers utilizing 
Faux fur has increasingly become more popular for fashion designers to incorporate throughout their collections. Today's technology gives faux fur the qualities and techniques as real fur. Hannah Weiland, founder of Shrimps, a London-based faux fur company, says, "I love working with faux fur because it doesn't molt and it feels just as soft. If the faux kind feels as good, why use the real kind?" Weiland is not the only designer taking advantage of faux fur qualities. Additionally, Stella McCartney incorporates faux fur throughout her collections with tagged patches reading "Fur Free Fur." In 2014, Hugo Boss pledged to become fur-free publicly in their 2014 Sustainability Report, relaying the message that animal cruelty is never fashionable. They look forward to moving on through the use of faux fur in their future collections. However, the notion of sustainability and ethics aren't always the reasoning behind designers decision for faux instead of real fur. The ability to control more aspects of manufacturing such as color and volume is one reason designers choose faux.  De Libran, the artistic director for Sonia Rykiel, incorporates both real and faux fur in her collections. Her incorporation of faux is based on the playfulness it portrays in her garments through the color and volume she is able to create. In other brands, Prada embraced synthetics in their Fall/Winter 2007 collection. Miuccia Prada, the brand's owner and designer, commented she was bored with real fur, and as a result, she included all faux in her collection that year. However, today, Prada has been using both real and faux fur throughout their garments. In addition, Dries Van Noten, Hussein Chalayan, Julien David, Julie de Libran for Sonia Rykiel, Kate Spade, and many others all featured faux fur in their fall collections.

Due to the controversy of fur garments, technology facilitating the production of fake furs has improved greatly since the early twentieth century. There are new tailoring and dyeing techniques to "disguise" fur and change the traditional image of fur with its conventional image associated with the elite fur-clad woman.  Modacrylic is a high-quality 'fur' alternative that gains attraction to its convincing look as an alternative to real fur. Howard Strachman of Strachman Associates, a New York-based agent for faux fur states that synthetic acrylic knitted fabrics have become a go-to resource for high-end faux fur, much of it coming from Asia. Prada put mohair faux fur in its Fall 2007 collection, whilst Max Mara and Dries Van Noten have also used this alternative.

More authentic-looking methods of production are being researched. One technique is combining coarse and fine fibers to simulate mink or beaver fur.

References

External links 
 How fake fur is made

Fur
Animal hair products
Artificial materials
Winter fabrics